The 1925–26 season was Galatasaray SK's 22nd in existence and the club's 16th consecutive season in the Istanbul Football League.

Squad statistics

Competitions

İstanbul Football League

Standings

Matches

Finals

Friendly Matches
Kick-off listed in local time (EEST)

References
 Futbol, Galatasaray. Tercüman Spor Ansiklopedisi vol.2 (1981) (page 560)
 1925-1926 İstanbul Futbol Ligi. Türk Futbol Tarihi vol.1. page(46). (June 1992) Türkiye Futbol Federasyonu Yayınları. 
 Tuncay, Bülent (2002). Galatasaray Tarihi. Page (117) Yapı Kredi Yayınları 
 Tekil, Süleyman. Dünden bugüne Galatasaray(1983). Page(174-175). Arset Matbaacılık Kol.Şti.

External links
 Galatasaray Sports Club Official Website 
 Turkish Football Federation - Galatasaray A.Ş. 
 uefa.com - Galatasaray AŞ

Galatasaray S.K. (football) seasons
Turkish football clubs 1925–26 season
1920s in Istanbul